Vaigattbogen is a bay at the eastern side of Spitsbergen, located between Ny-Friesland and Olav V Land, and opening into Hinlopen Strait. The glacier Hinlopenbreen debouches into Vaigattbogen.

References

Bays of Spitsbergen